Syed Ibrāhīm Khān, was a Faujdar of the Mughal Bengal's Sylhet Sarkar. He succeeded Isfandiyar Beg as faujdar in 1665. In the same year, Khan granted 11.25 hals of land in the parganas of Alinagar, Dakshinkachh and Ita to Mohesh Bhattacharya, father of Ramapati Bhattacharya, of Tengra. Bhattacharya was a Bharadwaj Gotri of the Brahmin caste. He also gave some land to Lakshminath Janabdar, father of Krishnacharan Sharma, in Bahadurpur Pargana. Khan's successor was Faujdar Jan Muhammad Khan.

See also
History of Sylhet
Farhad Khan

References

Rulers of Sylhet
17th-century rulers in Asia
17th-century Indian Muslims